Chianan,  Chia-nan, or Jianan may refer to:

 Chiayi–Tainan Plain, also known as the Chianan or Jianan Plain (Jiānán Píngyuán), a large plain on Taiwan Island
 Chianan Irrigation (Jianán Dàzùn), also known as the Kanan Irrigation, used by farms in the Taiwanese plain

See also
 Wang Jianan (disambiguation)
 Jian'an (disambiguation) or Chien-an, sometimes misspelled as Jianan or Chianan
 Kanan (disambiguation), the Japanese pronunciation of the same characters